The 2019–20 BLNO was the 20th season of the Basketball League of Norway since its establishment. Kongsberg Miners were the defending champions.

On 11 March 2020, the season was ended prematurely due to the coronavirus pandemic.

Format
The ten participating teams first played the regular season, that consisted in a round-robin schedule containing three rounds with every team playing each opponent at least once home and once away for a total of 27 matches.

At the end of the regular season, the top eight teams qualified for the playoffs.

Teams

Regular season

Standings

Results

Playoffs
The playoffs were played in a best-of-three games format. During the quarterfinals, the league was cancelled because of the COVID-19 pandemic.

Bracket

Quarter-finals

|}

Semi-finals

|}

Finals

|}

References

External links
Official Norwegian Basketball Federation website

BLNO
Norway
Basketball
Basketball